Longdale is a town in northwestern Blaine County, Oklahoma, United States. The population was 262 at the 2010 census, down 18.3 percent from the figure of 310 in 2000.

History
The town was named for Lucious Walter Long, the husband of Carrie M. Millerman, who had obtained a homestead in the Cheyenne-Arapaho Opening of April 19, 1892. The two married and made her homestead the town site. They donated  on the north side of their property to the Union Real Estate and Townsite Company, while retaining the southern side themselves, which they divided into residential and commercial lots. The Longs wanted to name their new community Longview, but agreed to change to Longdale to avoid confusion with the already existing community of Fairview.

Historians have sometimes confused Longdale with Cainville. The Cainville post office was discontinued and moved to Longdale on November 28, 1903, with Robert L. Eaton as the new postmaster. On October 23, 1903, G. W. published the first edition of his newspaper, the Longdale Register. The Longs already had sold part of their property to the Kansas City, Mexico and Orient Railway, which finally reached Longdale on June 10, 1905.

A new school building opened in Longdale on November 5, 1906, replacing the temporary facility. By the first census in 1910, Longdale had a population of 296.

Geography
Longdale is located at  (36.132697, -98.551962).

It is north of Canton Lake on State Highway 58.

Climate

Demographics

, there were 310 people, 114 households, and 81 families residing in the town. There were 167 housing units at an average density of 630.2 per square mile (248.0/km2). The racial makeup of the town was 73.87% White, 18.39% Native American, 0.32% from other races, and 7.42% from two or more races. Hispanic or Latino of any race were 4.52% of the population.

There were 114 households, out of which 30.7% had children under the age of 18 living with them, 59.6% were married couples living together, 6.1% had a female householder with no husband present, and 28.1% were non-families. 27.2% of all households were made up of individuals, and 13.2% had someone living alone who was 65 years of age or older. The average household size was 2.72 and the average family size was 3.22.

In the town, the population was spread out, with 31.3% under the age of 18, 9.7% from 18 to 24, 22.6% from 25 to 44, 18.1% from 45 to 64, and 18.4% who were 65 years of age or older. The median age was 33 years. For every 100 females, there were 115.3 males. For every 100 females age 18 and over, there were 99.1 males.

The median income for a household in the town was $19,000, and the median income for a family was $22,500. Males had a median income of $27,813 versus $16,250 for females. The per capita income for the town was $9,744. About 23.3% of families and 23.1% of the population were below the poverty line, including 25.0% of those under age 18 and 37.8% of those age 65 or over.

Education
Longdale School, which closed in 1991,was nothing more than a single class of 20 kids, and was closed due to lack of funding and constant drug problems. The school was of no renown and was practically useless.

Notable person
 Merlin Little Thunder. Southern Cheyenne artist, attended elementary school in Longdale.

References

External links
 Encyclopedia of Oklahoma History & Culture - Longdale

Towns in Blaine County, Oklahoma
Towns in Oklahoma